The Unknown Mariachi (Spanish:El mariachi desconocido) is a 1953 Mexican comedy film directed by Gilberto Martínez Solares and starring Germán Valdés, Rosa de Castilla and Gloria Mange.

The film's sets were designed by the art director Ramón Rodríguez Granada.

Cast
 Germán Valdés as Agustín / Tin Tan  
 Rosa de Castilla as Lupita  
 Gloria Mange as Yolanda  
 Marcelo Chávez as Marcelo 
 Tito Novaro as Manuel  
 Lupe Carriles as Doña Chona, tía de Lupita  
 Alta Mae Stone as Gringa en el tenampa  
 Gregorio Acosta as Sacaborrachos del tenampa  
 José Ortega as Ojitos de capulin  
 Jorge Chesterking as Gringo en el tenampa  
 Georgina González as Clienta del rebozo  
 Emilio Garibay as Charro en el tenampa  
 Ignacio Peón as Feriante de los caballos  
 José Escanero as Don Casimiro, feriante de las pelotas  
 Magda Pastor 
 Rosita Fornés as Rosita 
 Armando Bianchi as Señor Bianchi  
 Silvia Carrillo as Bailarina  
 Víctor Manuel Castro as Hombre en el tenampa  
 José Chávez 
 María Luisa Cortés as Pasajera en avión 
 Margarito Esparza Nevare as Enano 
 Eulalio González as Policía  
 Leonor Gómez as Puestera  
 Isabel Herrera as Espectadora en carpa  
 Ángela Rodríguez as Amiga de Tin  
 Magdalena Sánchez
 Manuel 'Loco' Valdés as Hombre en el tenampa  
 Ramón Valdés as Detective

References

Bibliography 
 Rogelio Agrasánchez. Cine Mexicano: Posters from the Golden Age, 1936-1956. Chronicle Books, 2001.

External links 
 

1953 films
1953 comedy films
Mexican comedy films
1950s Spanish-language films
Films directed by Gilberto Martínez Solares
Films scored by Manuel Esperón
Mexican black-and-white films
1950s Mexican films